Dark Shadows: The Doll House is a 2010 Big Finish Productions original dramatic reading based on the long-running American horror soap opera series Dark Shadows.

Plot 
Jenny Collins' fate is determined as she reveals her past to Beth.

Cast
Jenny Collins – Marie Wallace
Beth Chavez – Terry Crawford

External links
Dark Shadows - The Doll House

Dark Shadows audio plays
2010 audio plays
Works by James Goss